= Cosmic Samson =

1. REDIRECT Draft:Cosmic Samson
